Humaydah ibn an-Nu'man al-Bariqi, was a companion of Muhammad. He was the leader of the tribe of Bariq and an extremely successful military general during the reign of Rashidun Caliph Umar. Humaydah also fought under Sa`d's command against the Sassanid army at the Battle of al-Qādisiyyah.

Lineage 
His full name was Humaydah b. al-Nu'man b. Humaydah b. al-Harith b. Awf b. Amr b. Sa`d b. Thailbh b. Kinanah al-Bariqi Ibn Bariq Ibn Uday Ibn Haritha Ibn Amr Mazikiee Ibn Aamr bin Haritha Algtarif bin Imru al-Qais Thailb bin Mazen Ibn Al-Azd Ibn Al-Ghoth Ibn Nabit Ibn Malik bin Zaid Ibn Kahlan Ibn Saba'a (Sheba) Ibn Yashjub Ibn Yarab Ibn Qahtan Ibn Hud (Eber).

Nu'man b. Humaydah al-Bariqi was  his father.

References

Further reading
History of the Prophets and Kings (1/2218 2258, 2259 and 2334)
The Complete History (2/286 347 to 355)

Generals of the medieval Islamic world
Arab generals
Companions of the Prophet
Banu Bariq